The Granville Sentinel is an English weekly newspaper in Granville, Ohio that covers general news.

References

External links 
 Granville Sentinel Home

Newspapers published in Ohio